Romain Winding (born 25 December 1951) is a French cinematographer.

Selected filmography

References

External links

1951 births
Living people
French cinematographers
People from Boulogne-Billancourt
César Award winners